Tusken Raiders (informally referred to as "Sand People") are fictional creatures in the Star Wars universe created by George Lucas. They are characterized as a nomadic race who live on the planet Tatooine. They first appeared in the 1977 film Star Wars.

Depiction
The Tusken Raiders are depicted as xenophobic and are known to be highly aggressive in their interactions with other species, though they are capable of compromise and cooperation with outsiders. They dress in heavy cloth robes, and have covered their heads with strips of cloth to hold a breath mask and eye protection on. They have learned how to train the Banthas native to Tatooine as mounts, and a marauding group of Tuskens will ride them single file, to hide their numbers.

Appearances in Star Wars media
Tusken Raiders first appear in Star Wars when a pack of them attack Luke Skywalker in the Jundland Wastes and knock him unconscious. However, just as they are going through Luke's landspeeder, Obi-Wan Kenobi frightens them off by imitating a Krayt dragon's mating call and rescues Luke.
Tusken Raiders briefly appear in Episode I: The Phantom Menace, taking shots at the Boonta Eve Classic podracer pilots, and again in Episode II: Attack of the Clones, set 22 years before Star Wars; in this film, they kidnap Anakin Skywalker's mother, Shmi Skywalker, and torture her for a month. Anakin eventually finds her, but she is mortally injured and dies in his arms. Seized by a violent rage, Anakin slaughters the entire tribe including the women and children. In Star Wars Rebels Season 3, Episode 20, a group of Tuskens attack Ezra and Chopper when they land on Tatooine to look for Kenobi, successfully destroying their ship. However, Ezra and Chopper escape and the Tuskens are killed by Darth Maul.

Tusken Raiders appear in The Mandalorian. In the Season 1 episode "Chapter 5: The Gunslinger", Din Djarin comes across a small group of Raiders while travelling through their land, in search of a bounty. They are initially hostile until he communicates with them via sign language. He successfully barters a pair of binoculars in exchange for safe passage. In the Season 2 episode "Chapter 9: The Marshal", a Tusken clan teams up with villagers from Mos Pelgo in order to slay a krayt dragon.

A tribe of Tusken Raiders appear in various flashbacks in the first three episodes of The Book of Boba Fett, where they find Boba Fett after the latter escaped from the Sarlacc, was robbed of his Mandalorian armor, and left for dead. They initially force him to work as a slave digging for black melons in the desert, until he wins their respect and admiration after he kills a large sand creature, saving a Tusken child's life in the process. Following this, the Tuskens welcome Fett as one of their own, teaching him their combat style and desert survival skills, and eventually initiating him into their tribe after he passes a trial. In turn, Fett helps the Tuskens raid a Pyke Syndicate spice train that had been attacking their territory, teaching them how to ride speeder bikes in the process, and demands that the Pykes pay a toll to the tribe before entering their territory again in the future. However, after returning from collecting the toll, Fett finds that the tribe has been massacred, seemingly by the Nikto gang he had stolen the speeder bikes from, and holds an impromptu funeral. In the seventh episode, it is revealed that it was the Pykes who killed the tribe and framed the Nikto gang.

Expanded Universe

According to the noncanon Star Wars Expanded Universe sources, Tusken Raiders are named after Fort Tusken, an early Old Republic mining settlement in which all of the settlers were overwhelmed, captured, or killed by Tusken Raiders, then referred to as "Sand People". The attack probably occurred due to the fort's placement over one of the Raiders' holy wells.

Although the Sand People are aggressive and violent by nature, they have deep-seated traditions that they cling to tightly. Young raiders are required to prove their adulthood in various physical activities. While the Sand People have no written language, the most revered member of a Tusken clan is the storyteller. He knows the life-story of every member of his clan, and also knows of the clan's history. The storyteller is required to memorize the histories word-for-word, eliminating any chance for misinterpretation or distortion. Apprentice storytellers often are more hard-pressed to prove themselves than warriors, for a single mistake in reciting the histories means instant death by decapitation. As violent as their nature is, Sand People stay as far from the moisture farmers as the farmers do them. There are occasional skirmishes with the more outlying settlements.

Specialists studying the past of the Tusken Raiders also used the term Ghorfa to denote an earlier sedentary phase of their culture, and lastly Kumumgah, for the earliest stratum of sentient civilization on the planet, believed by some to represent a common ancestry shared by the Ghorfas (the Tuskens) and the Jawas.

The comic book series Star Wars: Republic explains that exiled Jedi Sharad Hett and his son A'Sharad Hett lived among the Tusken Raiders for many years. Hett was one of the few non-Tuskens to be accepted into their ranks and was even given the title of "warlord". Although A'Sharad Hett believed he was half-Tusken for the better part of his life, during his training on Coruscant he learned that Humans and Tusken Raiders were genetically unable to interbreed. This leads him to believe that his mother must have been a human, captured by the Tusken Raiders at a young age and raised as a Tusken. The series Star Wars: Legacy, set some 200 years later, reveals that A'Sharad eventually turned to the dark side of the Force and, as the Sith Lord Darth Krayt, briefly conquered the galaxy.

In the Junior Jedi Knights and New Jedi Order series, it is revealed that Jedi Knight Tahiri Veila was raised by the Tusken Raiders after they killed her parents.

A Tusken Raider named "Hoar" appears as a playable character in the PlayStation fighting game Star Wars: Masters of Teräs Käsi. In the Xbox Original game Star Wars: Battlefront II players are allowed to play as Tusken Raiders in a special game mode called "hunt".

Tusken Raiders appear in Knights of the Old Republic and The Old Republic when players visit Tatooine. If the player pursues peace between the Tusken Raiders and the local mining corporations in Knights of the Old Republic, the player will be given an opportunity to learn the entire history of the Tusken Raiders and Tatooine. During the recital of Tusken Raider history, the player learns that Tusken Raiders were once human exactly like the player, Tatooine though now a desert planet was once a lush and verdant world, and the original humans in the Star Wars Galaxy were abducted from this world by the Rakata of the Infinite Empire and then seeded among the stars as slaves building the Infinite Empire's monuments.

Eventually the humans of Tatooine rebelled against the Infinite Empire, and in retaliation their world was destroyed by an orbital bombardment of the entire surface. Remaining groups of survivors adapted to the world's new destroyed surface, and the lesson that they took from all of this was that it was a sin to advance technologically and reach for the stars like their ancestors did. The player's companion will note that because the history has been passed only through recitation that it may be inaccurate; however almost everything the Tusken Raider recites to the player is confirmed throughout the game, and the only thing left to be confirmed is whether or not the Tusken Raiders were in fact once human and the origin for all humans throughout the galaxy.

References

External links 

Film characters introduced in 1977
Fictional ethnic groups
Fictional extraterrestrial life forms
Fictional humanoids
Fictional hunters
Fictional polearm and spearfighters
Fictional warrior races
Star Wars Skywalker Saga characters
Star Wars species